Gilan Keshah (also Romanized as Gīlān Keshah; also known as Chīlānkashā, Chīlān Kasheh, Chilankesha, and Jīlānkasheh) is a village in Gilvan Rural District, in the Central District of Tarom County, Zanjan Province, Iran. At the 2006 census, its population was 1,459, in 349 families.

References 

Populated places in Tarom County